Agnone Bagni is a southern Italian beach resort and hamlet (frazione) of Augusta, a municipality part of the Province of Syracuse, Sicily.

In 2011, it had a population of 120.

Geography

References

Further reading

External links
 

Frazioni of the Province of Syracuse